Mink Creek or Otskonoga, also known as Trout Brook, is a stream in northern Otsego County, New York. Its source is adjacent to US Route 20 just east of the community of Brighton and west-northwest of the Village of Richfield Springs and flows northeast into an unnamed swamp in adjacent Herkimer County. It then exits the swamp and flows south back into Otsego County before converging with Canadarago Lake south of Richfield Springs. The Iroquois' name for the creek is Otskonoga.

Fishing
Suckers can be speared and taken from the creek from January 1 to May 15, each year.

References

Rivers of New York (state)
Rivers of Otsego County, New York
Rivers of Herkimer County, New York